Holger G. Ziegeler (born Regensburg June 20, 1961) is a German physicist and diplomat.

Biography 
Ziegeler studied mathematics, physics and general linguistics at the University of Regensburg, the University of Vienna, and as a Fulbright scholar at the Ohio State University in Columbus (Ohio), obtaining his Master of Science degree in 1983 and the title of Diplom-Physiker in 1987.  After initial research in particle physics, he turned to artificial intelligence (neural networks, knowledge engineering, hypertext) in the course of his work for Siemens Austria (1987-1992).

After joining the German diplomatic service in 1992, Ziegeler held different positions in Germany, Paraguay, the United States, and Ethiopia. Between 2007 and 2011, he focused on multilateral development policy with the World Bank Group. He was instrumental in the creation of the IFC Infrastructure Crisis Facility and initiated the German Federal Government‘s concept on powers shaping globalization.

During 2011 Ziegeler served as Coordinator of the International Afghanistan-Conference in Bonn.

In 2012, he was appointed Director of the German Information Center USA in Washington, D.C.  He joined the Federation of German Industries in Berlin in 2013 as Special Representative for International Economic Partnerships and Alliances and returned in 2014 to the Federal Foreign Office as Head of International Economic Promotion in Countries and Regions.

In 2016, he was appointed as German Consul General in Jeddah, Saudi Arabia, and (effective 2018) Special Representative for the Organisation of Islamic Cooperation (OIC). In July 2020, he received a new commission as Consul General in Karachi, Pakistan.

Controversy 
Holger Ziegeler was accused of sexual harassment and groping at Scrapfest, an event funded by the German consulate that was meant to serve as a safe space for Pakistan's marginalized LGBTQ community. According to several attendees, Ziegeler harassed multiple women and groped a woman at the venue. They claim that he exploited his access and status as a funder to sexualize and violate indigenous queer people at an event meant to celebrate them. 

The German Federal Foreign Office was investigating the allegations but no progress in these investigations was ever made public.

References

External links 
 CV on website German Representations in Pakistan

1961 births
German diplomats
Living people
University of Regensburg alumni
University of Vienna alumni
Ohio State University alumni